Valle de Lierp, in Ribagorçan and Aragonese: Val de Lierp, is a municipality located in the province of Huesca, in Aragon, Spain. According to the 2004 census (INE), the municipality has a population of 49 inhabitants.

References

Municipalities in the Province of Huesca